The Chicago, Rock Island and Gulf Railway was a Texas subsidiary of the Chicago, Rock Island and Pacific Railroad.

The railroad was chartered in 1902 with intention to construct a railway from Fort Worth, Texas to Galveston, Texas.

References

Predecessors of the Chicago, Rock Island and Pacific Railroad
Defunct Texas railroads
Railway companies established in 1902
Railway companies disestablished in 1948